Evhen Khytrov (born 18 August 1988) is a Ukrainian professional boxer. Khytrov won the gold medal at Middleweight division at the 2011 World Amateur Boxing Championships in Baku.

Khytrov was also 2011 Ukrainian Nationals champion, and a former Boxing European Cup and European Juniors Boxing Championships winner.  He competed at the 2012 Summer Olympics.

Career highlights

Professional career

Khytrov vs. Aleem 
On January 14, 2018, Khytrov fought Immanuwel Aleem for the vacant WBC Silver middlweight title. Aleem defeated Khytrov in the sixth round via TKO.

Professional boxing record

| style="text-align:center;" colspan="8"|20 wins (17 knockouts), 2 losses, 0 draws
|-  style="text-align:center; background:#e3e3e3;"
|  style="border-style:none none solid solid; "|Res.
|  style="border-style:none none solid solid; "|Record
|  style="border-style:none none solid solid; "|Opponent
|  style="border-style:none none solid solid; "|Type
|  style="border-style:none none solid solid; "|Round
|  style="border-style:none none solid solid; "|Date
|  style="border-style:none none solid solid; "|Location
|  style="border-style:none none solid solid; "|Notes
|- align=center
|Win
|18–2
|align=left| Malcom McAllister
|
|
|
|align=left|
|align=left|
|- align=center
|Loss
|17–2
|align=left| Brandon Adams
|
|
|
|align=left|
|align=left|
|- align=center
|Win
|17–1
|align=left| Morgan Fitch
|
|
|
|align=left|
|align=left|
|- align=center
|Win
|16–1
|align=left| Jonathan Batista
|
|
|
|align=left|
|align=left|
|- align=center
|Win
|15–1
|align=left| Derrick Findley
|
|
|
|align=left|
|align=left|
|- align=center
|Lose
|14–1
|align=left| Immanuwel Aleem
| 
|
|
|align=left|
|align=left|
|- align=center
|Win
|14–0
|align=left| Paul Mendez
| 
|
|
|align=left|
|align=left|
|- align=center
|Win
|13–0
|align=left| Kenneth McNeil
| 
|
|
|align=left|
|align=left|
|- align=center
|Win
|12–0
|align=left| Josh Luteran
| 
|
|
|align=left|
|align=left|
|- align=center
|Win
|11–0
|align=left| Nick Brinson
| 
|
|
|align=left|
|align=left|
|- align=center
|Win
|10–0
|align=left| Aaron Coley
| 
|
|
|align=left|
|align=left|
|- align=center
|Win
|9–0
|align=left| Jorge Meléndez
| 
|
|
|align=left|
|align=left|
|- align=center
|Win
|8–0
|align=left| Maurice Louishome
| 
|
|
|align=left|
|align=left|
|- align=center
|Win
|7–0
|align=left| Louis Rose
| 
|
|
|align=left|
|align=left|
|- align=center
|Win
|6–0
|align=left| Willie Fortune
| 
|  
|  
|align=left|
|align=left|
|- align=center
|Win
|5–0
|align=left| Chris Chatman
| 
|  
|  
|align=left|
|align=left|
|- align=center
|Win
|4–0
|align=left| Jas Phipps
| 
|  
|  
|align=left|
|align=left|
|- align=center
|Win
|3–0
|align=left| Julius Kennedy
| 
|  
|  
|align=left|
|align=left|
|- align=center
|Win||2–0||align=left| Romon Barber
|||
|
|align=left|
|align=left|
|- align=center
|Win
|1–0
|align=left| Christian Nava
|||
|
|align=left|
|

References

External links
 Profile on AIBA
Evhen Khytrov - Profile, News Archive & Current Rankings at Box.Live

1988 births
Sportspeople from Kryvyi Rih
Living people
Middleweight boxers
Boxers at the 2012 Summer Olympics
Olympic boxers of Ukraine
Ukrainian male boxers
Ukrainian expatriate sportspeople in the United States
AIBA World Boxing Championships medalists
Lviv State University of Physical Culture alumni